The 1961 San Jose State Spartans football team represented San Jose State College during the 1961 NCAA University Division football season.

San Jose State played as an Independent in 1961. Led by fifth-year head coach Bob Titchenal, they played home games at Spartan Stadium in San Jose, California. The Spartans finished  with a record of six wins and four losses (6–4), and were outscored  183 to 185.

Schedule

Team players in the NFL/AFL
The following San Jose State players were selected in the 1962 NFL Draft.

The following San Jose State players were selected in the 1962 AFL Draft. 

The following finished their San Jose State career in 1961, were not drafted, but played in the AFL.

Notes

References

External links
 Game program: San Jose State vs. Washington State at Spokane – October 28, 1961

San Jose State
San Jose State Spartans football seasons
San Jose State Spartans football